McKinley is an unincorporated community in Jefferson Township, Washington County, in the U.S. state of Indiana.

History
A post office was established at McKinley in 1891, and remained in operation until 1934. The community was likely named after president William McKinley.

Geography

References

Unincorporated communities in Washington County, Indiana
Unincorporated communities in Indiana